This is a list of flag bearers who have represented Poland at the Olympics.

Flag bearers carry the national flag of their country at the opening ceremony of the Olympic Games.

See also
Poland at the Olympics

References

Poland at the Olympics
Poland
Olympic flagbearers